Kim Miyori (born Cheryl Utsunomiya; January 4, 1951) is an American actress, best known for the role of Dr. Wendy Armstrong, a beleaguered resident, on the first two seasons (1982–1984) of the medical drama St. Elsewhere.

Miyori was born in Santa Barbara, California to a bookkeeper/ receptionist mother and a federal corrections officer father.

Miyori has also appeared in the TV shows Babylon 5, Murder, She Wrote, Magnum P.I., JAG and 24.

Filmography 
Cold Case (2007) (TV) - Evelyn Takahashi
The Grudge 2 (2006) - Kayako's Mother
Ghost Whisperer (2005) (TV) - Dr. Keiko Tanaka
JAG (2004) (TV) - Internist / Commander Shelley Purcell
My American Vacation (1999) - Ming Yee
Metro (1997) - Detective Kimura
Babylon 5 (1996) (TV) - Captain Sandra Hiroshi
Hijacked: Flight 285 (1996) (TV) - Stewardess Barbara
Solar Eclipse (1995) (VG) - Susan Powell
Shadow of Obsession (1994) (TV) - Angela
Journey to the Center of the Earth (1993) (TV) - Dr. Tesue Ishikawa
Body Shot (1993) - Christine Wyler
Fire! Trapped on the 37th Floor (1991) (TV) - Willa Reeves
Hiroshima: Out of the Ashes (1990) (TV) - Mrs. Ota
The Punisher (1989) - 'Lady' Tanaka
The Big Picture (1989) - Jenny Sumner
Loverboy (1989) - Kyoko Bruckner
Island Sons (1987) (TV) - Diane Ishimura
Murder, She Wrote: "Steal Me a Story" (1987) (TV) - Gayle Yamada
When the Bough Breaks (1986) (TV) - Kim Hickle
T. J. Hooker: "Blood Sport" (1986) (TV) - Barbara Grayle
Super Password (January 27–31, 1986) - Celebrity Guest
John and Yoko: A Love Story (1985) (TV) - Yoko Ono
Generation (1985) (TV) - Teri Tanaka
Murder 101 (1984) (TV) - Kia Nadao
Match Game-Hollywood Squares Hour (March 26-March 30, 1984) - Celebrity Guest
The $25,000 Pyramid (February 27-March 2, 1984) - Celebrity Guest
Antony and Cleopatra (1983) (TV) - Iras
Magnum P.I. (1982) TV series - Asani Osawa  (October 14, 1982)
St. Elsewhere (1982) TV series - Dr. Wendy Armstrong (1982–1984)
Zoot Suit (1981) - Manchaka (also appeared in the same role in the 1979 Broadway production of the play)
Sgt. Pepper's Lonely Hearts Club Band (1978) - Dancer

References

External links
 
 

1951 births
American film actresses
American television actresses
Living people
American actresses of Japanese descent
American film actors of Asian descent
Actresses from Santa Barbara, California
20th-century American actresses
21st-century American actresses